North Dakota Highway 50 (ND 50) is a  north–south state highway in the U.S. state of North Dakota. ND 50's western terminus is a continuation as Montana Highway 258 (MT 258) at the Montana border, and the eastern terminus is at U.S. Route 52 (US 52) northwest of Donnybrook.

Major intersections

References

050
Transportation in Williams County, North Dakota
Transportation in Burke County, North Dakota
Transportation in Ward County, North Dakota